Ohthere (also Ohtere), Old Norse Óttarr vendilkráka (Vendelcrow; in Modern Swedish Ottar Vendelkråka) was a semi-legendary king of Sweden of the house of Scylfings, who is said to have lived during the Germanic Heroic Age, possibly during the early 6th century (fl. c. 515 – c. 530).  

His name can be reconstructed as Proto-Norse *Ōhta-harjaz or *Ōhtu-harjaz. The harjaz element is common in Germanic names and has a meaning of "warrior, army" (whence English harry); by contrast, the oht element is less frequent, and has been tentatively interpreted as "fearsome, feared".

A prince of the Swedes, Ohthere and his brother Onela conducted successful raids against the Geats after King Hrethel had died. In 515, their father Ongentheow was killed in battle by the Geats, and Ohthere succeeded his father as the king of Sweden. Ohthere led an army against the Geats, and besieged one of their armies. He nearly killed the Geatish king Hygelac but lost many of his forces in the conflict. Ohthere managed to get back to Sweden. In the 520s, Ohthere led a large raid to Denmark and plundered the Danish coast. A Danish army led by two Jarls, however, was waiting for him. Battle broke out. The Danish were reinforced, and Ohthere was killed in the battle. His corpse was taken back to Sweden and buried in an earthwork mound.

Beowulf
In the Old English poem Beowulf, the name of Ohthere appears only in constructions referring to his father Ongenþeow (fæder Ohtheres), mother (Onelan modor and Ohtheres), and his sons Eadgils (suna Ohteres, sunu Ohteres) and Eanmund (suna Ohteres).

When Ohthere and his actions are concerned, he is referred to as Ongenþeow's offspring, together with his brother Onela. The following section deals with Ohthere and Onela pillaging the Geats at the death of their king Hreðel, restarting the Swedish-Geatish wars:

Later, it is implied in the poem that Ohthere has died, because his brother Onela is king. Ohthere's sons Eadgils and Eanmund fled to the Geats and the wars began anew.

Scandinavian sources 
Ynglingatal, Ynglinga saga, Íslendingabók, and Historia Norvegiae all present Óttarr as the son of Egill (called Ongenþeow in Beowulf) and as the father of Aðísl/Aðils/athils/Adils (Eadgils).

According to the latest source, Ynglinga saga, Óttarr refused to pay tribute to the Danish king Fróði for the help that his father had received. When Fróði sent two men to collect the tribute, Óttarr answered that the Swedes had never paid tribute to the Danes and would not begin with him. Fróði gathered a vast host and looted in Sweden, but the next summer he pillaged in the east. When Óttarr learnt that Fróði was gone, he sailed to Denmark to plunder in return and went into the Limfjord where he pillaged in Vendsyssel. Fróði's jarls Vott and Faste attacked Óttarr in the fjord. The battle was even and many men fell, but the Danes were reinforced by the people in the neighbourhood and so the Swedes lost (a version apparently borrowed from the death of Óttarr's predecessor Jorund). The Danes put Óttarr's corpse on a mound to be devoured by wild beasts, and made a wooden crow that they sent to Sweden, with the message that the wooden crow was all that Óttarr was worth. After this, Óttarr was called Vendelcrow.

It is only Snorri who uses the epithet Vendelcrow, whereas the older sources Historia Norvegiae and Íslendingabók use it for his father Egill. Moreover, only Snorri's work tells the story of  Óttarr's death in Vendsyssel, and it is probably his own invention. Ynglingatal mentions only that Óttarr was killed by the Danish jarls Vott and Faste in a place named Vendel (Laing has been influenced by Snorri's version in his translation):

The Historia Norwegiæ presents a Latin summary of Ynglingatal, older than Snorri's quotation (continuing after Egil):

Historia Norvegiæ informs only that Ohthere was killed by the Danish brothers Ottar [sic.] and Faste in a Danish province called Vendel.

Ohthere's Barrow
Ohthere's barrow (Swedish: Ottarshögen) is located in Vendel parish, Uppland, Sweden. The barrow is 5 metres high and 40 metres wide. In the 17th century, the barrow was known locally as Ottarshögen. The term Hög is derived from the Old Norse word haugr, meaning mound or barrow.

The barrow was excavated in the period 1914–16. It showed the remains of both a man and a woman, and the finds were worthy of a king. The Swedish archaeologist Sune Lindqvist reported that in its centre, there was a wooden vessel with ashes. There were few finds but they were well-preserved. There were some decorative panels similar to those found in the other Vendel era graves nearby. A comb with a case was found, as well as a golden Roman coin, a solidus, dated to be no later than 477. It had been perforated and was probably used as decoration, but it showed signs of wear and tear and had probably been worn for a longer time. Lindqvist stated that the identification of the barrow as that of Ohthere could not receive more archaeological confirmation than those provided by the excavation.

Notes

References
Nerman, B. Det svenska rikets uppkomst. Stockholm, 1925.

6th-century monarchs in Europe
Characters in Beowulf
People whose existence is disputed
Semi-legendary kings of Sweden
Monarchs killed in action